In mathematics, more specifically in chromatic homotopy theory, the redshift conjecture states, roughly, that algebraic K-theory  has chromatic level one higher than that of a complex-oriented ring spectrum R.
It was formulated by John Rognes in a lecture at Schloss Ringberg, Germany, in January 1999, and made more precise by him in a lecture at Mathematische Forschungsinstitut Oberwolfach, Germany, in September 2000. In July 2022, Burklund, Schlank and Yuan announced a solution of a version of the redshift conjecture for arbitrary -ring spectra, after Hahn and Wilson did so earlier in the case of the truncated Brown-Peterson spectra BP<n>.

References 

Notes

Further reading

External links 

Algebraic topology
Homotopy theory
Conjectures